"Any Love" is song by American recording artist Luther Vandross released as the first single from his sixth studio album of the same name (1988)

Chart performance
"Any Love" earned Vandross his fourth No. 1 single on Billboards Hot Black Singles Chart, and No.44 on the Hot 100. "Any Love" also peaked at No. 12 on the Adult Contemporary Chart. Outside the US, "Any Love" went to No. 31 in the UK.

Charts

Accolades
The song also garnered two Grammy Award nominations at the 31st Annual Grammy Awards for Best R&B Song and Best Male R&B Vocal Performance.

References

External links
 luthervandross.com

1988 singles
1988 songs
Luther Vandross songs
Songs written by Luther Vandross
Songs written by Marcus Miller